Sir William Douglas Young  (27 January 1859 – 7 March 1943) was a colonial administrator from British Columbia who was Governor of the Falkland Islands from 1915 to 1920.

Early life
William Young was born in the newly created Colony of British Columbia, where his father, William Alexander George Young (a paymaster and captain's secretary in the Royal Navy, attached to the British Northwest Boundary Commission) was the first Colonial Secretary. His mother was Cecilia Eliza Cowan Cameron, born in British Guiana; her stepfather, David Cameron  was Chief Justice of the neighbouring Crown Colony of Vancouver Island, and her uncle James Douglas was the first Governor of British Columbia. William Young was educated at Charterhouse School, and entered the British Colonial civil service in 1877, aged 18.

Career
In 1889, Young was appointed chief Clerk in the Government Secretary's Office, British Guiana, where his mother was born and grew up with his grandmother. In 1895 he became Assistant Colonial Secretary of Mauritius, where he was acting Colonial Secretary in 1896, 1897 and 1898. In 1901, he was appointed Commissioner of the Turks and Caicos Islands where he worked until 1905. He was Administrator of Dominica (part of the British Leeward Islands) in 1906 and was made CMG in the birthday honours list of November 1907.

He was appointed acting Governor and Commissioner-in-Chief in the British Leeward Islands in 1909, and Administrator and Colonial Secretary of St. Lucia in 1913. He moved to the Windward Islands where he was acting Governor and Commissioner-in-Chief in 1914, before his last posting as Governor of the Falkland Islands from 1915 to 1920. During his time as governor he banned humpback whaling for the 1918–1919 season in the Falkland Islands Dependencies, based on a reduction in numbers in the previous year.

Young was made a Knight Commander of the Order of the British Empire in the 1919 Birthday Honours.

He was a member of the Isthmian Club.

Family
William Young was the oldest of three children born to William A. G. Young, R.N., and Cecilia Eliza Cowan Cameron. His siblings were:

Mary Alice Young (b. 1862). She married Frederick Mitchell Hodgson, later Governor of Gold Coast and Governor of British Guiana. In 1901 she published a volume entitled The Siege of Kumassi, which described her experiences in Kumasi with Hodgson in that critical episode in the Ashanti War of 1900. She was a Lady of Grace of the Order of Saint John of Jerusalem. 
 Sir Alfred Joseph Karney Young (1 August 1864 – 5 January 1942). He was a judge in the British colonies; he briefly played cricket for Kent C.C., and was later Chief Justice of Fiji and Chief Judicial Commissioner for the Western Pacific.

References
Notes

Citations

Sources

 
 
  
  
 

Chief justices of Fiji
1859 births
1943 deaths
People educated at Charterhouse School
Knights Commander of the Order of the British Empire
British Guiana people
British Mauritius people
British Leeward Islands people
British Windward Islands people
Governors of the Falkland Islands
British colonial governors and administrators in Africa
Governors of the Turks and Caicos Islands
Governors of British Saint Lucia
Governors of Dominica
Colonial Secretaries of Mauritius